The Boys is an American sitcom television series that aired on CBS from August 20 until September 17, 1993.

Premise
A horror novelist moves into a house and starts hanging out with the friends of the man who recently died there.

Cast
Christopher Meloni as Doug
Ned Beatty as Bert
Richard Venture as Al
John Harkins as Harlan
Doris Roberts as Doris
Isabella Hofmann as Molly

Episodes

References

External links
 

1993 American television series debuts
1993 American television series endings
1990s American sitcoms
English-language television shows
CBS original programming
Television series by CBS Studios
Television shows set in Seattle